Tadeusz Baranowski (born 1945 in Zamość) is a Polish comic book artist. He published his first comic in 1975 in Świat Młodych. Invited by Grzegorz Rosiński he worked a few years in Belgium, publishing some comics in Tintin magazine, however due to interference from magazine owners he quit this job and returned to Poland in the 1990s.

In Poland, most of his comics had 2 editions: first softcover in late 1970s/early 1980s, and second hardcover in 2000s.

Works 
Skąd się bierze woda sodowa i nie tylko - MAW 1980, DSW Omnibus 1989
Na co dybie w wielorybie czubek nosa eskimosa - MAW 1980, MAW 1984
3 przygody Sherlocka Bombla - Interpress 1984, Kultura Gniewu/Zin Zin Press 2004
Antresolka profesorka Nerwosolka - MAW 1985 
Podróż smokiem Diplodokiem - MAW 1986, MAW 1988 
Jak ciotka Fru-Bęc uratowała świat od zagłady - DHW Akapit 1989
Przepraszam remanent - Bea 1990 
Ecie-pecie o wszechświecie, wynalazku i komecie (2 tomiki) - Story 1990
Historia wyssana z sopla lodu (scenariusz: Jean Dufaux) - Unipress 1991
To doprawdy kiepska sprawa, kiedy Bestia się pojawia... - Rok Corporation 1992
Orient Men: Forever na zawsze - Egmont 2002
Porady Praktycznego Pana - Egmont 2003
Antresolka profesorka Nerwosolka - Egmont 2003
Skąd się bierze woda sodowa i nie tylko - Egmont 2004
O zmroku - Kultura Gniewu 2005
Podróż Smokiem Diplodokiem - Manzoku 2005
Tffffuj! Do bani z takim komiksem! - Orient Men i Spółka 2005

References

1945 births
Living people
Polish comics artists
Recipients of the Silver Medal for Merit to Culture – Gloria Artis